USS Gem (SP-41) was an armed yacht that served in the United States Navy as a patrol vessel from 1917 to 1919.

Gem was built in 1913 as a private steam-powered yacht of the same name by George Lawley & Son at Neponset, Massachusetts. The U.S. Navy acquired her under charter from her owner, William Ziegler Jr., on 26 March 1917 for World War I service. She was commissioned as USS Gem (SP-41) on 1 June 1917 at New York City.

Gem performed harbor entrance patrol at New Haven, Connecticut, until 12 December 1917. She was then assigned to experimental work under the Submarine Defense Association. In this duty, carried out at New York City; New London, Connecticut; Newport, Rhode Island; and New Haven, she experimented with camouflage defense, tested the Bates Automatic Course Indicator, and experimented with various submarine detection devices, including the Sanborn Speed Indicator. She also performed colloidal fuel experiments with pulverized coal at New Haven and New York.

The Navy decommissioned Gem on 10 January 1919 and returned her to her owner the same day.

References

Department of the Navy: Naval Historical Center: Online Library of Selected Images: U.S. Navy Ships: USS Gem (SP-41), 1917–1919. Originally, and later, the Civilian Steam Yacht Gem (1913)
NavSource Online: Section Patrol Craft Photo Archive Gem (SP 41)

Patrol vessels of the United States Navy
World War I patrol vessels of the United States
Ships built in Boston
Steam yachts
1913 ships